Jamaluddin bin Mohd Jarjis (25 May 1951 – 4 April 2015) was a Malaysian politician, diplomat and Minister of Science, Technology and Innovation. He served as the Chairman of the 1 Malaysia Peoples' Housing (PR1MA) and Malaysian special envoy to the United States.

Early life and education
Born on 25 May 1951 in Pekan, Pahang, Jamaluddin Jarjis obtained a First Class Honours Bachelor of Science Degree in Electrical Engineering from the University of Manchester, United Kingdom in 1974 and MSc in Electrical Engineering from the University of Manitoba, Canada in 1977. He received his PhD in Electrical Engineering (Power Systems) from McGill University in 1980.

Political career
Jamaluddin was a Member of Parliament for Rompin, Pahang from 1990 until his death. He was elected to the UMNO Supreme Council in May 2000.

While serving as Science, Technology and Innovation Minister, Jamaluddin oversaw the Angkasawan program, which resulted in Dr. Sheikh Muszaphar Shukor becoming the first Malaysian in space on 10 October 2007, when he blasted off to the International Space Station on board Soyuz TMA-11.

Cabinet positions
Jamaluddin held various positions in the Cabinet of Malaysia:
 Second Minister of Finance (November 2002 – January 2004)
 Minister of Domestic Trade and Consumer Affairs (January 2004 – March 2004)
 Minister of Science, Technology and Innovation (March 2004 – March 2008)
 Ambassador of Malaysia to the United States (July 2009 – February 2012)

Family
Jamaluddin was married to a  dentist, Puan Sri Datin Sri Dr. Kalsom Ismail, a renowned hardliner. The couple had four children.

Jamaluddin died in April 2015. In August 2018, his 83-year-old mother Aminah Abdullah has sought the Syariah Court to issue a faraid (Islamic wealth distribution) certificate to seek her share of her late son's estate said to be worth at least RM2.1 billion.

Death
On 4 April 2015, Jamaluddin Jarjis was killed when an AS 3655N2 Dauphin (Registration Number 9M-1GB) crashed into a jungle at Jalan Sungai Lalang in Kampung Pasir Baru near Semenyih, Selangor. Among those killed were a businessman, CEO of SP Baiduri Sdn Bhd, Tan Huat Seang and also a private secretary in the Prime Minister's Office, Azlin Alias. He was buried at Makam Pahlawan, located inside Masjid Negara compound, Kuala Lumpur.

Election results

Honours

Honours of Malaysia
  :
  Commander of the Order of Loyalty to the Crown of Malaysia (PSM) – Tan Sri (2014)
  :
  Knight Companion of the Order of the Crown of Pahang (DIMP) – Dato' (1992)
  Grand Knight of the Order of the Crown of Pahang (SIMP) – formerly Dato', now Dato' Indera (2001)
  Grand Knight of the Order of Sultan Ahmad Shah of Pahang (SSAP) – Dato' Sri (2004)
  :
  Knight Grand Commander of the Order of the Life of the Crown of Kelantan (SJMK) – Dato' (2004)
  :
  Knight Grand Commander of the Order of the Crown of Perlis (SPMP) – Dato' Seri (2007)

References

 
 

 

Malaysian engineers 
Malaysian people of Malay descent
Malaysian Muslims
Members of the Dewan Rakyat
Alumni of the University of Manchester Institute of Science and Technology
University of Manitoba alumni
McGill University alumni
1951 births
2015 deaths
People from Pahang
United Malays National Organisation politicians
Ambassadors of Malaysia to the United States
Malaysian expatriates in the United States
Victims of helicopter accidents or incidents
Victims of aviation accidents or incidents in Malaysia
Commanders of the Order of Loyalty to the Crown of Malaysia
Finance ministers of Malaysia
Science ministers of Malaysia
Trade ministers of Malaysia